Fong Sai-yuk II (also known as The Legend II and The Legend of Fong Sai-yuk II; released in the Philippines as Once Upon a Time in China-6) is a 1993 Hong Kong martial arts comedy film directed by Corey Yuen, and also produced by and starring Jet Li as Chinese folk hero Fong Sai-yuk. The film is a sequel to Fong Sai-yuk, which was released earlier in the same year. Two former Miss Hong Kong Pageant winners, Michelle Reis and Amy Kwok, portrayed Fong Sai-yuk's wives.

Plot
Fong Sai-yuk and his wife, Ting-ting, are now full-fledged members of the Red Flower Society, a secret society seeking to overthrow the Qing dynasty. The society's leader is Fong's godfather, Chan Ka-lok, who intends to groom Fong to become his successor. Chan's deputy, the ruthless Yu Chun-hoi, stands in Fong's way and tries to harm him. The society's members are unaware that Chan is actually a long-lost younger brother of the Qianlong Emperor. Although Chan is faithful to the society's cause, he fears that the members might renounce their loyalty to him if they discover his true identity. Meanwhile, some Japanese rōnin find evidence of Chan's true identity and attempt to pass it to the Qianlong Emperor in a red box.

Chan sends Fong and others on a mission to intercept the rōnin and retrieve the evidence, but Fong is distracted by a damsel in distress and focuses on rescuing her instead. At a critical moment, when Fong is almost killed by the rōnin, his mother, Miu Tsui-fa, shows up and saves him. Despite so, the rōnin get away and pass the evidence to Suen Si-ngai, the Viceroy of Guangdong province. The woman whom Fong rescued earlier is Suen On-yee, the viceroy's daughter. Chan plans for Fong to woo Suen On-yee and extricate the red box from her. Fong enters a martial arts contest that the viceroy arranges to win On-yee's hand in marriage and use the opportunity to steal the Red Box. Suen On-yee, meanwhile, has fallen in love with Fong and marries out of real love. However, the viceroy is aware of Fong's true intention in the marriage so he sends soldiers to capture Fong. Suen On-yee manages to persuade her father to release Fong by threatening to commit suicide.

Fong returns to the Red Flower Society with the red box, but lies that he has failed in his mission because he does not want Yu Chun-hoi to steal the evidence and use it to defame Chan. Since Fong had promised earlier that he would permanently disable himself if he fails the mission, Yu Chun-hoi malevolently reminds Chan to abide by the agreement. Chan cripples Fong, rendering him unable to practise martial arts again. However, Chan had pretended to disable Fong by inflicting him with superficial wounds only, so Fong recovers quickly. Meanwhile, Yu incites the society's members to turn against Chan and seizes the leadership position. Yu then sends his men to kill Fong in order to silence him. Fong manages to escape but his mother is captured by Yu. To save his mother, Fong returns and fights his way through the men, heroically blindfolding himself so that he will not see his former fellows spilling blood. Fong confronts Yu, and kills him after an intense fight. He rescues his godfather from prison and restores him to the leadership position. In the end, Fong's two wives come to terms with each other and talk and behave in absolute unison. Fong declares that he will retire from the martial artists' community and spend the rest of his life with his family.

Cast
Jet Li as Fong Sai-yuk
Josephine Siao as Miu Tsui-fa
Adam Cheng as Chan Ka-lok
Michelle Reis as Lui Ting-ting
Amy Kwok as Suen On-yee
Corey Yuen as Lee Kwok-bong
Ji Chunhua as Yu Chun-hoi
Peter Chan as Magu

Release
Fong Sai-yuk II was released on 30 July 1993. In the Philippines, the film was released Solar Films as Once Upon a Time in China-6 on 30 August 1995, connecting the film to Jet Li's unrelated Once Upon a Time in China film series.

Home media
In the United Kingdom, the film (released as The Legend II) was watched by  viewers on television in 2004, making it the year's third most-watched foreign-language film on television (below Crouching Tiger, Hidden Dragon and First Strike). The original Fong Say-yuk (released as Jet Li's The Legend) drew  UK viewers the same year, adding up to a combined  UK viewership for both films in 2004.

Alternate versions

American version
The DVD release published by Dimension is dubbed in English and contains different music cues compared to the original Hong Kong Universe version. The Hong Kong prints come in different releases such as Universe Old version DVD (embedded subtitles), Universe Remastered DVD (optional subs), Universe VCD (embedded subtitles, based on the old release), and the Tai Seng VHS (also based on the old release). The American version, released as The Legend II, cuts out a scene where Lee Kwok-Bong is naked while leaving the rest of the film intact. The remastered Universe DVD maintains a red tint throughout the entire film except in night scenes.

Taiwanese version
The Taiwanese version, released as Gongfu Huangdi 2 (功夫皇帝2; Kungfu Emperor 2) and dubbed in Mandarin, is distributed by Scholar/Taiwan and runs longer than all other versions. The opening sequence of the film shows a white screen with red Chinese credits. The Hong Kong version has English credits while the Taiwanese version does not. The following are some scenes that have been omitted in all other versions:

Flashback scenes at the beginning, featured in colour and not in black and white as in the Hong Kong version. There is an additional scene of Miu Tsui-fa talking and eating at the same time and another scene showing Fong Sai-yuk as a child. Some flashback scenes from the previous film have been omitted as well.
A dialogue after Ting-ting says, "You only care for your mom, not me!". There is a scene of Chan Ka-lok saying, "Sai-yuk, let's go".
The bath scene showing Lee Kwok-bong's bare bottom has been cut from the Taiwanese version for print damage and nudity.
Final fight scene: An extended scene of Yu Chun-hoi stamping on Fong Sai-yuk's face.

The Taiwanese version contains Jet Li's original voice in Mandarin. The up and down black bars move up and down because of film transfer and does not feature the red tint featured in the Hong Kong remastered DVD.

References

External links

 

HKMDB
HK Cinemagic

1993 films
1993 action comedy films
1993 martial arts films
1990s Cantonese-language films
Hong Kong films about revenge
Films directed by Corey Yuen
Films set in 18th-century Qing dynasty
Kung fu films
Hong Kong martial arts comedy films
Hong Kong sequel films
Wushu films
Wuxia films
1990s Hong Kong films